S.O.S (abbreviation of Sensation of Stage) is an Indonesian girl group whose members composed of the finalists of Galaxy Superstar talent show. This group is formed by YS Media Entertainment and received training for some months from Rainbowbridge Agency, a South Korean-based K-pop Artist Incubation Company.

Pre Debut
Before their debut, they were finalists of Galaxy Superstar which aired on Indosiar TV. Two members, Mary and Yeye, qualified into the top 11 and underwent training in South Korea. In the midst of the show, Mary had to be eliminated and hence, return to Indonesia. Yeye was left to be the member who stayed the longest in the show, although she did not win the show. After Galaxy Superstar talent show ended, YS Media Entertainment reassemble the top 20 finalists of the Galaxy Superstar which included Anggi, Andi Adisty, Sania, and Febrianty plus Yeye and Mary, then dispatched the six of them in Korea to undergo training under Korea management Rainbow Bridge Agency for more than a year. They are in training in terms of vocal, dance, attitude and so on until they are ready to be debuted. In Korea, they were intensively trained in skills of vocal, dance, acting, attitude upon debuting. Rainbow Bridge as the management that covered Anggi, Adisty, Febri, Sania, Maria and Yeye,. Twelve hours every day (except Sunday and holidays) they live in terms of vocal training and dance.

On February 14, 2013, they finally debut as SOS (Sensation Of Stage). The girl group put out the first mini-album called "Start Of Sensation" in which consisted of 4 tracks. Their debut single is titled "Drop It Low", released in 2 versions; English and Indonesian. "Drop It Low" was also created by a well-known composer in South Korea named Seo Yong Bae. For his own Indonesia Lyrics Version written by Indonesian novelist named Valiant Budi Yogi. MV / video clip of their debut single has been broadcast in 64 countries in Asia and Europe. Their second single titled "Independent Girl" was also released in 2 versions, English and Indonesian.

SOS consists of six members named Maria (Mary), Sania (Sun), Adisty (PB), Anggi (AG), Febrianty (JL) and Yeye (Yeye). Their fanclub was given the name 911 (nine one one), synonymous with their emergency concept from their name SOS. Fans also give nicknames to each member such as Mary (Primary), Sun (Sunshine), AG (AGorgeous), PB (PBeauty), JL (JLstars) and Yeye (Yeyeverss). SOS is the first Indonesian Girl Group which is the result of cooperation between Indonesia and Korea under management of YS Media Entertainment and Rainbow Bridge Agency.

Mini album
The first mini-album, titled Start Of Sensation contains four tracks. The album contains their best songs "Drop It Low" (Indonesia and English Version) and "Independent Girl" (Indonesian and English Version). Their album concept is more directed to the Rock Girls / Bad Girls. Was seen in terms of the costumes they wear on song "Drop it Low". Drop It Low tells the story of a woman who left her boyfriend then she got up to go and change all the appearances for the sake of revenge against her boyfriend that she is not old, it's sad because her boyfriend left. Whereas for Independent Girl song is continuation of the story of the song "Drop it Low" to whom she became independent and strong woman who lived in her lover's post.

On 21 September 2013, SOS has finally issued a second mini-album called The 1st Love. Where this album is a continuation of the story of the previous album (Start Of Sensation). In this album, the story in the song is more directed to women who are in love. Evident from the song "Tik Tok" in which the song tells of a woman waiting to fall in love again. Continued with the song "Cherry Love", where the song is a continuation of the story of the previous song "Tik Tok" which tells us that she found her other love / fall in love again. For "Show Me Love" is more directed to the story that she expects her love in reply. And a new concept for SOS, more Girly or feminine and sexy, it is seen from the costume style changes of each member.

Members

Discography

Mini album/extended play (first)

Mini album/extended play (second)

Single

Videography

Music video

References

External links
 

2012 establishments in Indonesia
English-language singers from Indonesia
Indonesian-language singers
Indonesian girl groups
K-pop music groups
Musical groups established in 2012